John Alan Hope (December 21, 1970 – April 18, 2018) was an American former professional baseball pitcher who played for the Pittsburgh Pirates of the Major League Baseball (MLB) from 1993 to 1996.

References

External links

1970 births
2018 deaths
American expatriate baseball players in Canada
Atlantic City Surf players
Augusta Pirates players
Baseball players from Fort Lauderdale, Florida
Buffalo Bisons (minor league) players
Calgary Cannons players
Carolina Mudcats players
Colorado Springs Sky Sox players
Gulf Coast Pirates players
Lehigh Valley Black Diamonds players
Major League Baseball pitchers
Pittsburgh Pirates players
Salem Buccaneers players
Welland Pirates players